Vincenzo Dorsa (26 February 1823 – 4 December 1855) was an Arbëresh scholar, writer and translator.

Life
Vincenzo Dorsa was born in 1823 to a prominent Arbëresh family. His father, Francesco, was a lawyer, and his mother was the granddaughter of Domenico Bellusci. His village, Frascineto, was settled by Albanians after the death of Skanderbeg. Influenced by the growth of interest in the Albanian people and language, and the Albanian National Awakening movement of the first half of the 19th century, in 1848 Dorsa published Dagli Albanesi, richerchie e pensieri. A summary of the history of the Albanian people, he dedicated it to "my nation divided and dispersed but one".

See also
Albanian literature

References

Activists of the Albanian National Awakening
Arbëreshë people
1823 births
1855 deaths
People from the Province of Cosenza
19th-century Albanian writers
Albanian translators
Albanian scholars
19th-century Italian writers
19th-century male writers
Italian translators
Italian scholars
19th-century translators